Campaigh or Campay is a steep and rocky islet in outer Loch Ròg, Lewis, Scotland that lies north of Cealasaigh and Little Bernera.

A huge natural arch transverses the northern half of the island from south west to north east and there is a large sea cave to the south. The islet of Cùl Champaigh lies offshore to the north, and tiny Sgeir Dearg (red skerry) and the larger Màs Sgeir (seagull skerry) beyond.

Notes 

Islands of Loch Ròg